My Cape of Many Dreams is a 1981 Taiwanese romance drama film directed by Liu Li-li, based on Chiung Yao's 1979 novel.

Cast
Shirley Lu as Lu Ya-chin
Shirley Lu as Sang Er-jou
Chin Han as Sang Er-hsuan
Kenny Bee as Wan Hao-jan
Fan Hung-hsuan as Sang Er-kai
Gua Ah-leh as Sang Yu-lan
Liu Lan-hsi as Tsao Yi-chuan
 as Grandma Sang
Tsao Chien as Doctor Li
Tao Shu as Mama Chi
Chang Hai-lun as Lee Man-ju
Paul Chang Chung as Lu Shih-ta

External links

Taiwanese romantic drama films
Films based on works by Chiung Yao
Films set in Taiwan
Films shot in Taiwan